KMAG (99.1 MHz) is a commercial FM radio station located in Fort Smith, Arkansas.  KMAG airs a country format.

The station's "KMAG" call letters were derived from Magazine Mountain, the former site of the station's transmitter.

Former logo

References

External links
KMAG official website

MAG
Country radio stations in the United States
IHeartMedia radio stations